Kristopher "Kip" McDaniel (born January 27, 1982 in Cobble Hill, British Columbia) is a Canadian rower.

McDaniel attended high school at Shawnigan Lake School on Vancouver Island. After high school he went on to get a Bachelor of Arts degree in Government from Harvard. He attended Cambridge University, where he rowed in the 2006 and 2007 Oxford and Cambridge Boat Races, at stroke oar in 2006. He was a two-time national champion at Harvard (in the stroke seat); while there, he also rowed for USA at the Lucerne World Cup in 2004. From 2005 until 2008, he was a member of the Canadian National Team, winning bronze medals at the 2005 and 2007 World Championships.

After retiring from competitive rowing in 2008, McDaniel became the editor-in-chief of aiCIO, a financial publication based in New York City. After leaving aiCIO in 2016, McDaniel became the editor-in-chief of Institutional Investor Magazine.

References

1982 births
Living people
Sportspeople from British Columbia
Harvard Crimson rowers
Canadian male rowers
Alumni of the University of Cambridge
Cambridge University Boat Club rowers
World Rowing Championships medalists for Canada
Shawnigan Lake School alumni